Lucapa Airport  is an airport serving Lucapa (also spelled Lukapa), the capital of the Lunda Norte Province in northeastern Angola.

See also

 List of airports in Angola
 Transport in Angola

References

External links 
OpenStreetMap - Lucapa
OurAirports - Lucapa
 

Airports in Angola
Lunda Norte Province